Duke of Lerma is a hereditary title in the Peerage of Spain accompanied by the dignity of Grandee, granted in 1599 by Philip III to Francisco Gómez de Sandoval, 4th Count of Lerma and his royal favourite.

Dukes of Lerma (1599)

Francisco Gómez de Sandoval y Rojas, 1st Duke of Lerma
Francisco Gómez de Sandoval y Rojas, 2nd Duke of Lerma
Mariana Isabel Gómez de Sandoval y Rojas, 3rd Duchess of Lerma
Ambrosio de Aragón y Gómez de Sandoval, 4th Duke of Lerma
Diego Gómez de Sandoval y Rojas, 5th Duke of Lerma
Catalina Gómez de Sandoval y Mendoza, 6th Duchess of Lerma
Gregorio María de Silva y Mendoza, 7th Duke of Lerma
Juan de Dios de Silva y Mendoza, 8th Duke of Lerma
María Francisca de Silva y Gutiérrez de los Ríos, 9th Duchess of Lerma
Pedro de Alcántara Álvarez de Toledo y Silva, 10th Duke of Lerma
Pedro de Alcántara Álvarez de Toledo y Salm-Salm, 11th Duke of Lerma
Pedro de Alcántara Téllez-Girón y Beaufort Spontin, 12th Duke of Lerma
Mariano Téllez-Girón y Beaufort Spontin, 13th Duke of Lerma
Fernando Fernández de Córdoba y Pérez de Barradas, 14th Duke of Lerma
María de la Paz Fernández de Córdoba y Fernández de Henestrosa, 15th Duchess of Lerma
Fernando Larios y Fernández de Córdoba, 16th Duke of Lerma

See also
List of dukes in the peerage of Spain
List of current Grandees of Spain

References

Dukedoms of Spain
Grandees of Spain
Lists of dukes
Lists of Spanish nobility